Copelatus insulanus is a species of diving beetle. It is part of the genus Copelatus in the subfamily Copelatinae of the family Dytiscidae. It was described by Félix Guignot in 1939.

References

insulanus
Beetles described in 1939